The American Council of Witches (sometimes called the Council of American Witches) was an independent group founded in 1973 consisting of approximately seventy-three members who followed Pagan, Neopagan, or Witchcraft traditions; the group convened and disbanded in 1974 after drafting a set of common principles.

History
The council convened April 11–14, 1974, in a Spring "Witchmeet" in Minneapolis, Minnesota to postulate a summary set of principles which would clarify the actuality of Neopagan religions in North America, unify and define the many differing beliefs across the many paths and traditions prevalent in Neopaganism at that time, and to counteract misinformation, cultural stigma, stereotypes, and lack of governmental recognition.  The council was assembled by Carl Llewellyn Weschcke, president of Llewellyn Worldwide Ltd., one of the largest publishers of occult, Neopagan, and New Age books in the world. These "Principles of Belief", also referred to as "The Thirteen Principles of Belief" or "The Thirteen Principles of Wiccan Belief", are still endorsed by many American Witches, Neopagan groups, and individuals.

In 1978 these principles were incorporated into the United States Army's Religious Requirements and Practices of Certain Selected Groups: A Handbook for Chaplains in a section on the Wiccan religion. This section was prepared under the direction of Rev. Dr. J. Gordon Melton, director of the Institute for the Study of American Religion and editor of the Encyclopedia of American Religion.

The American Council of Witches disbanded later that year due to difficulties in reconciling differences among its members' traditions.

Views of the Council
The position expressed in the document is that modern Witches are not bound to any modern interpretation of historical evidence or any contemporary hierarchy, but are rather subject only to their inherent Divine connection: "We are not bound by traditions from other times and other cultures and owe no allegiance to any person or power greater than the Divinity manifest through our own being."

The Council also expressed a desire to include anyone wishing to be affiliated with a Neopagan tradition, as long as their views, attitudes, and opinions do not contradict or oppose those of the tradition: "In seeking to be inclusive, we do not wish to open ourselves to the destruction of our group by those on self-serving power trips, or to philosophies & practices contradictory to these principles. In seeking to exclude those whose ways are contradictory to ours, we do not want to deny participation with us to any who are sincerely interested in our knowledge & beliefs, regardless of race, color, sex, age, national or cultural origins, or sexual preference."

Thirteen Principles of Belief
In April 1974 members drafted a general set of principles loosely acceptable across the many traditions participating in the Council. These Principles of Wiccan Belief remain important to many modern-day Neopagan groups and individuals.

Revival attempts
Attempts to revive the Council, first in 2011, and again in 2015, were met with heavy scrutiny from witches and contemporary pagans.  Both revival attempts collapsed among widespread concern regarding unclear goals and lack of transparency.

Notes

References
 Extract from the Department of the Army Pamphlet No. 165-13: Religious Requirements and Practices of Certain Selected Groups: A Handbook for Chaplains
 Principles of Wiccan Belief by Carl Weschcke - Bookrags Website

Modern pagan organizations based in the United States
Wicca in the United States
Modern pagan organizations established in 1973
Defunct modern pagan organizations
Religious organizations disestablished in 1974